"Lost Without Your Love" is a song written and composed by David Gates, and originally recorded by the soft rock group Bread, of which Gates was the leader and primary music producer. It is the title track of Bread's last album which was released in 1976, and the song became their final top 10 hit.

The single lasted 16 weeks on the U.S. Billboard Hot 100, longer than any of their other songs except their greatest hit, "Make It With You".  It became their comeback hit after an absence from the chart of three and a half years, during which time Gates began his solo career.

In the US, "Lost Without Your Love" peaked at number 9, and number 3 on the Easy Listening charts.  Outside the US, "Lost Without Your Love" spent two weeks at number 8 in Canada and number 1 on the country's Easy Listening chart.

Chart performance

Weekly charts

Year-end charts

References

External links
 

1976 songs
1976 singles
Bread (band) songs
Songs written by David Gates
Elektra Records singles
Torch songs